An exarchate is any territorial jurisdiction, either secular or ecclesiastical, whose ruler is called an exarch. Byzantine Emperor Justinian I created the first exarchates during his invasion of the former Western Roman Empire, and the term is still used for naming some of the smaller communities of Eastern Rite Catholics as well as Eastern Orthodox Christians.

Administration of the secular Byzantine Empire 
 Exarchate of Africa
 Exarchate of Ravenna

Ecclesiastical administration

Catholicism

Apostolic exarchates in the Eastern Catholic churches 
 Greek Catholic Apostolic Exarchate of Greece
 Greek Catholic Apostolic Exarchate of Istanbul
 Apostolic Exarchate in Germany and Scandinavia for the Ukrainians
 Apostolic Exarchate of Serbia (until 19 January 2013 was named Apostolic Exarchate of Serbia and Montenegro) 
 Apostolic Exarchate in the Czech Republic

Maronite Catholic Patriarchal exarchates 
 Maronite Catholic Patriarchal Exarchate of Jerusalem and Palestine
 Maronite Catholic Patriarchal Exarchate of Jordan

Melkite Greek Catholic Patriarchal exarchates 
 Melkite Greek Catholic Patriarchal Exarchate of Kuwait
 Melkite Greek Catholic Patriarchal Exarchate of Istanbul
 Melkite Greek Catholic Patriarchal Exarchate of Iraq

Ukrainian Catholic Archiepiscopal exarchates 
 Ukrainian Catholic Archiepiscopal Exarchate of Lutsk

Eastern Orthodoxy

Exarchates of the Ecumenical Patriarchate of Constantinople 
 Exarchate of Metsovo (historical)
 Exarchate of the Philippines
 Exarchate of Western Europe (pending for dissolution)
 Ukrainian Exarchate (1620–1685)

Exarchates of the Orthodox Church in America 
 American Exarchate of Mexico

Exarchates of the Russian Orthodox Church  
 Belarusian Exarchate
 Exarch Diocese of the Russian Orthodox Church in Spain and Portugal
 Patriarchal Exarchate in Western Europe
 Patriarchal Exarchate in South-East Asia
 Russian Exarchate of North America (historical)
 Little Russian Exarchate (1685–1718, 1743–1767) → Ukrainian Exarchate (1921–1990)

See also 
 Eparchy